Paradesmiphora is a genus of longhorn beetles of the subfamily Lamiinae, containing the following species:

 Paradesmiphora amazonica Galileo & Martins, 1998
 Paradesmiphora farinosa (Bates, 1885)

References

Desmiphorini